The Coalition Cabinet of Xenophon Zolotas was sworn in on November 23, 1989 when the November 1989 Greek legislative election resulted in a hung parliament. After an agreement between the three biggest parties, New Democracy, Panhellenic Socialist Movement and Coalition of the Left and Progress, a coalition government of national unity (οικουμενική κυβέρνηση) was formed under Xenophon Zolotas, the former governor of the Bank of Greece, which replaced the previous caretaker government of Ioannis Grivas. Zolotas reshuffled the cabinet on February 13, 1990.

When the government completed its work on April 8, 1990, elections were held under the electoral law passed by the Papandreou government.

First Cabinet

Second Cabinet

See also

Zolotas
1980s in Greek politics
1990s in Greek politics
Cabinets established in 1989
Cabinets disestablished in 1990
1989 in Greece
1990 in Greece
1989 establishments in Greece
1990 disestablishments in Greece
New Democracy (Greece)
PASOK